is a women's football club based in Nagano and affiliated with AC Nagano Parceiro. The team currently plays in the WE League, the highest division of women's football in Japan.

Kits

Kit suppliers and shirt sponsors

Staff

Managerial history

Players

Current squad

Season-by-season records

Transition of team name
Ohara Gakuen JaSRA Ladies SC: 2000–2009
AC Nagano Parceiro Ladies: 2010–present

See also
Japan Football Association (JFA)
List of women's football clubs in Japan
2022–23 in Japanese football

References

External links
 Official website

Women's football clubs in Japan
Association football clubs established in 1991
Sport in Nagano (city)
Sports teams in Nagano Prefecture
1991 establishments in Japan
AC Nagano Parceiro
WE League clubs